Plinthocoelium virens is a species of beetle in the family Cerambycidae. It was described by Dru Drury in 1770.

References

Callichromatini
Beetles described in 1770
Taxa named by Dru Drury